"You're the Top" is a Cole Porter song from the 1934 musical Anything Goes. It is about a man and a woman who take turns complimenting each other. The best-selling version was Paul Whiteman's Victor single, which made the top five.

It was the most popular song from Anything Goes at the start with hundreds of parodies.

The lyrics are particularly notable because they offer a snapshot as to what was highly prized in the mid-1930s and demonstrate Porter's rhyming ability.

Some of the lyrics were re-written by P. G. Wodehouse for the British version of Anything Goes.

People and items referenced in the song

The following is a list of the references used in the version recorded by Cole Porter on November 26, 1934:

 Colosseum
 Louvre Museum
 Melody from a symphony by Strauss
 Bendel bonnet
 Shakespeare's sonnets
 Mickey Mouse
 The Nile
 The Tower of Pisa
 The smile on the Mona Lisa
 Mahatma Gandhi
 Napoleon Brandy
 Purple light of a summer night in Spain
 National Gallery
 Garbo's salary (alternately recorded as "Crosby's salary", a reference to Bing Crosby, who twice starred in film versions of Anything Goes)
 Cellophane
 Turkey dinner
 The time of a Derby winner
 Arrow collar
 Coolidge Dollar (referencing the financial prosperity of the Roaring Twenties under US President Coolidge)
 The nimble tread of the feet of Fred Astaire
 O'Neill drama
 Whistler's Mother
 Camembert
 Rose
 Dante's Inferno
 The nose of Jimmy Durante
 Waldorf salad
 Berlin ballad
 A Dutch Master
 Mrs. Astor: Mary Astor, Lady Astor, Caroline Schermerhorn Astor, or Ellen Tuck French
 Pepsodent
 Steppes of Russia
 The pants on a Roxy usher

Additional references in other versions of the song:

 Dance in Bali
 Hot tamale
 A painting by Botticelli
 John Keats
 Percy Bysshe Shelley
 Ovaltine
 Boulder Dam
 The Moon
 Mae West's shoulder
 The nominee of the G.O.P. (Republican Party, which won the presidential elections of 1920, 1924 and 1928)
 Zuider Zee
 Broccoli (which had only recently become well known in the US)
 Ritz hot toddy
 Brewster body
 Bishop Manning
 Nathan panning
 A night at Coney
 The eyes of Irène Bordoni
 Tower of Babel
 Whitney stable
 Stein of beer
 A dress from Saks Fifth Avenue
 Next year's taxes
 Stratosphere
 Max Baer
 Russian ballet
 Rudy Vallée
 Phenolax (a 1930s laxative made from phenolphthalein)
 Drumstick lipstick
 Irish Sweepstakes
 Vincent Youmans

P. G. Wodehouse anglicised it for the British version of Anything Goes. Among other changes, he altered two lines from "You’re an O’Neill drama / You’re Whistler’s mama!" to "You’re Mussolini / You’re Mrs Sweeny" (both figures, later notorious, were widely admired at the time)

Versions of the song
In 1985, a series of Heinz Tomato Ketchup commercials in Canada featured various cover versions of the song as their jingle.
In John Mortimer's novel Paradise Postponed (1985) and the television series of the same name (Euston Films, 1986): A rendering of the song by a fictitious performer, Pinky Pinkerton, includes the line, "You're my Lady Grace", which signifies Lady Grace Fanner in the story.

Parodies
Porter biographer William McBrien wrote that at the height of its popularity in 1934 to 1935 it had become a "popular pastime" to create parodies of the lyrics. Porter, who himself had called the song "just a trick" the public would get bored by, was flooded with hundreds of parodies, one reportedly written by Irving Berlin. Despite the ribald nature of some of the parodies, McBrien believes few, including a King Kong parody, were written by Porter or Berlin.  The performance of the song in the American Cabaret Theatre biographical musical Cole & Noel (2001) had the line "I'm talkin' King Kong's penis".

References

External links
 Explanation of lyrics by Slate.com 	
 Additional Explanation of lyrics by Slate.com 	
 Explication of lyrics by Playbill
 Library of Congress essay on Porter's version on the National Recording Registry.

1934 songs
Ethel Merman songs
Barbra Streisand songs
Ella Fitzgerald songs
Songs written by Cole Porter
Songs from Anything Goes
List songs
United States National Recording Registry recordings